Frans Hombörg (11 June 1898 – 17 December 1943) was a Dutch footballer. He played in two matches for the Netherlands national football team in 1929.

References

External links
 

1898 births
1943 deaths
Dutch footballers
Netherlands international footballers
Place of birth missing
Association footballers not categorized by position